Carrs Creek is a river in Delaware County, New York. It flows into the Susquehanna River northeast of South Unadilla.

References

Rivers of New York (state)
Rivers of Delaware County, New York